The Manitoba Scotties Tournament of Hearts is the Manitoba provincial women's curling tournament. The tournament is run by Curl Manitoba, the provincial curling association. The winning team represents Manitoba at the Scotties Tournament of Hearts.

Event names
Eaton's Championship (1952–1960)
Silver D Championship (1961–1967)
Rose Bowl (1968–1972)
Manitoba Lassie (1973–1981)
Manitoba Scott Tournament of Hearts (1982–2006)
Manitoba Scotties Tournament of Hearts (2007–present)

Past winners
(National champions in bold)

Notes

References

External links
Past Provincial Champions - Curl Manitoba

Manitoba
Curling in Manitoba